Joseph Currie Hanna (born June 27, 1944) was an American politician who served in the Texas House of Representatives from 1991 to 1997.

He attended University of Texas at Austin earning a BBA and a JD. He was admitted to the State Bar of Texas in 1968. He was elected to the Texas House of Representatives in 1990. However, he lost reelection in 1996 to Jim Keffer.

References

External links

|-

1944 births
Democratic Party members of the Texas House of Representatives
University of Texas at Austin alumni
Living people
Place of birth missing (living people)